"O What a Thrill" is a song written by Jesse Winchester. It was originally recorded by James House for his 1989 self-titled debut album.

It was later released as a single by American country music group The Mavericks.  It was released in May 1994 as the second single from the album What a Crying Shame.  The song reached number 18 on the Billboard Hot Country Singles & Tracks chart. The Mavericks' version features House on backing vocals.

Chart performance

Year-end charts

References

1994 singles
1994 songs
The Mavericks songs
Song recordings produced by Don Cook
Songs written by Jesse Winchester
MCA Records singles
James House (singer) songs